is a Japanese actor. He starred in the musical Hedwig and the Angry Inch in 2004.

Hiroshi Mikami grew up in the 1960s with a family that was closely related to the entertainment industry with his mother being an actress and his uncle being a film producer. Mikami was in highschool where he went for his first audition and managed to get the leading role in Grass Labyrinth directed by Shuji Terayama. The film won critical praise in France where it became part of the trilogy Collections privées.

Mikami went on to star in various projects including the television comedy Kimi no Hitomi wo Taiho Suru to the film Desert Moon which was screened in competition at the 2000 Cannes Film Festival. He also has worked in stage, as in the 2004 where he played Hedwig in the Japanese version of "Hedwig and the Angry Inch".

Filmography

Film
 Grass Labyrinth (1979)
 Merry Christmas, Mr. Lawrence (1983)
 Peacock King (1988)
 Tōki Rakujitsu (1992)
 Swallowtail (1996)
 Parasite Eve (1997)
 Tokyo Decadence (1991)
 Desert Moon (2001)
 Premonition (2004)
 Mori, The Artist's Habitat (2018)
 Love Hotel ni okeru Jōji to Plan no Hate (2019)

Television
 Chance (1993)
 Operation Love (2007)
 Taira no Kiyomori (2012), Emperor Toba
 Trembling Cow (2013), Shin'ichi Tagawa
 Everyone's Demoted (2019), Teruo Yokoyama
 Okehazama (2021), Imagawa Yoshimoto

Awards

References

Sources

External links
 
 

1962 births
Living people
Japanese male actors